Birley with Upper Hill is a civil parish in Herefordshire, England, consisting of the small villages of Birley and Upper Hill, and most of the hamlet of Bush Bank.  According to the 2001 census, it had a population of 321, increasing to 339 at the 2011 census.

The Grade I listed church of St Peter dates back to the 12th century, and was the subject of restoration work in 2004, funded by the Heritage Lottery Fund. It is on Historic England's list of buildings at risk.

References

External links

Civil parishes in Herefordshire